Alfred Taylor (14 May 1944 – 16 June 2009) was a Barbadian cricketer. He played in four first-class matches for the Barbados cricket team in 1966/67.

See also
 List of Barbadian representative cricketers

References

External links
 

1944 births
2009 deaths
Barbadian cricketers
Barbados cricketers
People from Saint Michael, Barbados